Umair Zaman (born 24 June 1997 in Peshawar) is a Pakistani-born Qatari professional squash player. He was ranked world number 7 in under-19. As of February 2018, he was ranked number 185 in senior rankings in the world.

References

1997 births
Living people
Pakistani male squash players